was a village located in Oki District, Shimane Prefecture, Japan.

As of 2003, the village had an estimated population of 2,123 and a density of 40.52 persons per km2. The total area was 52.39 km2.

On October 1, 2004, Goka, along with the town of Saigō, and the villages of Fuse and Tsuma (all from Oki District), was merged to create the town of Okinoshima.

Dissolved municipalities of Shimane Prefecture